St. Michael the Archangel Ukrainian Catholic Church is a Ukrainian Catholic church located in Baltimore, Maryland. It was founded to initially serve the needs of the Ukrainian immigrant community in Baltimore.

History
Western Ukrainians (sometimes identified as Ruthenians or Rusyns) began to immigrate to Baltimore in the 1880s and by the 1890s Ukrainian Catholic priests were traveling from Pennsylvania to Baltimore to serve the Ukrainian Catholic community. St. Michael's parish was founded in 1893 and the church was built in 1912. The church population continued to grow throughout the 20th century, causing the church to seek home in a new building in 1981. The church lot was blessed in 1984 and the construction on the parish was completed by September, 1988. Final construction on the church was not completed until May, 1991. The church was dedicated in 1991, consecrated in November, 1992, and the Iconostasis was blessed in June, 1995. The painting of the interior was completed and blessed by Metropolitan Stephen Sulyk in November, 1997. The church was modeled after a design in Kyiv, Ukraine.

References

External links

 
 St. Michael the Archangel Ukrainian Orthodox Church in Baltimore, MD - 60!
 History of the Metropolia (Ukrainian Catholic Archeparchy of Philadelphia official website)
 Ukrainian Catholic Cathedral of the Immaculate Conception

Byzantine Revival architecture in Maryland
Canton, Baltimore
Catholicism in Maryland
Roman Catholic churches completed in 1893
Churches in Baltimore
Eastern Christianity in Maryland
Roman Catholic churches completed in 1991
Rusyn-American culture in Maryland
Ukrainian-American culture in Baltimore
Ukrainian-American history
Ukrainian Catholic churches in the United States
Ukrainian Catholic Metropolia of Philadelphia
1893 establishments in Maryland
Religious organizations established in 1893
19th-century Roman Catholic church buildings in the United States